Alexei Kolkunov (born 3 February 1977) is a Russian former professional ice hockey forward.

Career
Kolkunov played one season with Krylja Sovetov of the Russian Superleague before being selected by the Pittsburgh Penguins 154th overall in the 1995 NHL Entry Draft. He would remain in Russia until the completion of the 1997-98 RSL season. On 13 July 1998, the Penguins signed Kolkunov to a three-year contract. Several months later, he attended camp with the Penguins but was later assigned to the Syracuse Crunch, who were the Penguins' AHL affiliate at the time. Kolkunov would remain in North America until the start of the 2000-01 ECHL season, where he chose to go home after eight games instead of continuing to play with the Wheeling Nailers. Kolkunov would finish the season with Ak Bars Kazan of the RSL.

Kolkunov has remained in Russia, playing in the KHL, the second-tier VHL, and the third-tier RHL from 2000 until 2010 before signing a one-year contract with Yertis Pavlodar of the Kazakhstan Vyschaya Liga.

Career statistics

Regular season and playoffs

International

References

External links

1977 births
Ak Bars Kazan players
HC CSKA Moscow players
HC Khimik Voskresensk players
HC Spartak Moscow players
Krylya Sovetov Moscow players
Living people
Pittsburgh Penguins draft picks
Russian ice hockey centres
Syracuse Crunch players
Torpedo Nizhny Novgorod players
HC Vityaz players
Wheeling Nailers players
Wilkes-Barre/Scranton Penguins players
Yertis Pavlodar players
People from Belgorod
Sportspeople from Belgorod Oblast